Ryan David Edmondson (born 20 May 2001) is an English professional footballer who plays as a striker for  club Carlisle United.

Edmondson began his career at York City, making his first-team debut at the age of 16 in October 2017. He was signed by Leeds United for an undisclosed fee the following month and made his debut in the Championship in May 2018. He was called up to the England under-19's and scored one goal in three appearances. He spent the first half of the 2020–21 season on loan at Scottish Premiership club Aberdeen and spent the second half of the season with Northampton Town. He was loaned out to Fleetwood Town for the 2021–22 season, but was recalled early in January in order to find more game time with Port Vale. He helped the club earn promotion to League One via the League Two play-offs in 2022. He joined Carlisle United on a free transfer in June 2022.

Early life
Edmondson was born in Harrogate, North Yorkshire. He supported Leeds United as a child.

Career

Early career
Edmondson joined York City's academy in 2015 after being rejected by Huddersfield Town. He made his first-team debut in the National League North on 7 October 2017, when being substituted on in the 72nd minute in a 2–1 win over Brackley Town at Bootham Crescent. At the age of 16 years and 140 days, he became the third youngest player in the club's history. Manager Martin Gray said that the player had the potential to reach the Premier League.

Edmondson was signed by Championship club Leeds United on 15 November 2017, on a scholarship contract until June 2020 for an undisclosed fee. After impressing in the youth teams during the spring, Edmondson debuted for Leeds in the Championship on the last day of the season, 6 May 2018, as a 73rd-minute substitute in a 2–0 home victory against Queens Park Rangers, aged 16 years and 351 days. Manager Paul Heckingbottom praised the teenager's attitude after the match, though admitted that he had a long way to go before being ready to play regular first-team football.

Edmondson signed a new three-year contract with Leeds on 7 August 2018. At a later date he signed a new contract to keep him at Elland Road until summer 2023, though the news was not reported by the club at the time. He made one league appearance as a substitute for the first-team but thrived in the under-23 team, scoring 18 times during the 2018–19 season and, on 6 May, was part of the team who won the Professional Development League (Category 2) final in a 4–2 penalty shoot-out win (0–0 after extra time) against Birmingham City. Leeds were promoted into the Premier League at the end of the 2019–20 season, leaving Edmondson to need loan moves in order to find first-team football, though he would be closely monitored by head coach Marcelo Bielsa.

Loans
On 31 July 2020, Edmondson joined Scottish Premiership club Aberdeen on loan until January 2021. His debut came in their first match of the season as a 65th-minute substitute in a 1–0 defeat at home to Rangers. Manager Derek McInnes stated that "I thought when Edmondson came on that he gave us a bit more psychically and it annoyed their centre backs a bit more with his running power and his physical size". However soon afterwards he sustained an ankle injury in training, which was expected to prevent him from playing for a few months. However, he returned to the team earlier than expected, coming on as a substitute against Motherwell on 20 September. He scored his first goals for Aberdeen when he scored twice in a 4–2 win over Hamilton Academical on 20 October. He found game time hard to come by as he had originally been signed as a replacement for Sam Cosgrove, who was expected to leave but ended up staying at Pittodrie, and Edmondson returned to Leeds United at the end of his loan in January 2021.

On 14 January 2021, Edmondson joined League One club Northampton Town on loan until the end of the 2020–21 season. Manager Keith Curle had originally tried to sign him in the summer. He scored his first goal for the club on 6 March, in a 4–1 win over Portsmouth at Sixfields; he was awarded the goal by the dubious goals committee as it had been initially credited to teammate Sam Hoskins, whose lob was heading for the net before being bungled over the line by Edmondson. He ended the loan spell with two goals from 21 appearances. However he was dropped by manager Jon Brady after coming into personal difficulties off the pitch.

Edmondson joined League One club Fleetwood Town on 11 June 2021 on loan for the 2021–22 season. He struggled to establish himself at Highbury under both Simon Grayson and Stephen Crainey, and scored just two goals in 17 games before being recalled by Leeds United on 4 January 2022. Later that day, he was loaned out to League Two club Port Vale for the rest of the season. Manager Darrell Clarke said that "he fits the profile of the type player that we were looking for particularly with his presence, mobility and his touch". Edmondson scored his first goal for the "Valiants" on 1 February, his flicked header opening the scoring in a 1–1 draw with Forest Green Rovers at Vale Park. He was an unused substitute as Vale secured promotion to League One via the League Two play-offs with victory over Mansfield Town in the final at Wembley Stadium.

Carlisle United
Edmondson returned to League Two on a permanent basis on 23 June 2022 when he signed a two-year contract with Carlisle United on a free transfer.

International career
Edmondson received his first international call-up for the England national under-19 team's friendlies against Greece and Germany in September 2019. He made his debut on 5 September when starting against Greece at St George's Park, scoring in the 60th minute of a 3–1 win. He finished his career with the under-19s with three appearances, which all came in 2019, scoring one goal.

Style of play
Head of Academy Coaching at Leeds United Richard Cresswell described Edmondson as a striker with "a bit of everything", with his strengths being heading, work rate and hold up play.

Career statistics

Honours
Port Vale
EFL League Two play-offs: 2022

References
Infobox statistics
England U19: 

Specific

External links

Profile at the Carlisle United F.C. website

2001 births
Living people
Sportspeople from Harrogate
Footballers from North Yorkshire
English footballers
Association football forwards
York City F.C. players
Leeds United F.C. players
Aberdeen F.C. players
Northampton Town F.C. players
Fleetwood Town F.C. players
Port Vale F.C. players
Carlisle United F.C. players
National League (English football) players
English Football League players
Scottish Professional Football League players
England youth international footballers